Csongrád is a district in north-western part of Csongrád County. Csongrád is also the name of the town where the district seat is found. The district is located in the Southern Great Plain Statistical Region.

Geography 
Csongrád District borders with Kunszentmárton District (Jász-Nagykun-Szolnok County) to the northeast, Szentes District to the east, Kistelek District to the south, Kiskunfélegyháza District and Tiszakécske District (Bács-Kiskun County) to the west. The number of the inhabited places in Csongrád District is 4.

Municipalities 
The district has 1 town and 3 villages.
(ordered by population, as of 1 January 2012)

The bolded municipality is the city.

Demographics

In 2011, it had a population of 22,996 and the population density was 68/km².

Ethnicity
Besides the Hungarian majority, the main minority is the Roma (approx. 300).

Total population (2011 census): 22,996
Ethnic groups (2011 census): Identified themselves: 20,969 persons:
Hungarians: 20,366 (97.12%)
Gypsies: 305 (1.45%)
Others and indefinable: 298 (1.42%)
Approx. 2,000 persons in Csongrád District did not declare their ethnic group at the 2011 census.

Religion
Religious adherence in the county according to 2011 census:

Catholic – 13,412 (Roman Catholic – 13,380; Greek Catholic – 31);
Reformed – 621;
Evangelical – 63; 
other religions – 245; 
Non-religious – 3,165; 
Atheism – 179;
Undeclared – 5,311.

Gallery

See also
List of cities and towns of Hungary

References

External links
 Postal codes of the Csongrád District

Districts in Csongrád-Csanád County